The Bắc Hà dog (Vietnamese: chó Bắc Hà), is a medium size spitz dog breed and one of Vietnam's Four Great National Dogs (Vietnamese: tứ đại quốc khuyển). This primitive dog breed is primarily used a hunter and guard dog by the Hmong people in northern Vietnam, especially in the Bắc Hà district and Si Ma Cai district of Lào Cai province. While not FCI recognized, the Bắc Hà dog is recognized by the Vietnam Kennel Association.

History 

While much of the Bắc Hà dog's history is speculative, they are thought to be descended from heavier-coated mountain dogs of southern China who accompanied the Hmong in their migration to Vietnam. Hmong traditions reports that the Hmong people themselves originated near the Yellow River region of China. The Hmong people were subjected to persecution and genocide by the Qing dynasty in the eighteenth and nineteenth centuries, and many fled to the mountains of northern Vietnam.

According to Hmong legend, after arriving to Lào Cai, a dhole came down from the mountains and mated with the female dogs, producing puppies with red fur and especially wild and fierce temperaments. These puppies were the first Bắc Hà dogs.

In October 2020, a Bắc Hà dog named Sói won the Vietnamese Native Breeds Championship Dog Show.

Gallery

References 

Dog breeds originating in Asia
Animal breeds originating in Vietnam